Bocar Djumo (born 21 August 1994) is a Portuguese footballer who plays as a forward for Regionalliga Nord club BSV Schwarz-Weiß Rehden.

Career
On 17 August 2013, Djumo made his professional debut with União Madeira in a 2013–14 Segunda Liga match against Santa Clara, when he replaced Steve (67th minute).

References

External links

1994 births
Living people
Portuguese footballers
Association football forwards
Liga Portugal 2 players
Liga I players
Maltese Premier League players
Regionalliga players
C.F. União players
ASC Oțelul Galați players
Sliema Wanderers F.C. players
FC Oberlausitz Neugersdorf players
BSV Schwarz-Weiß Rehden players
Portuguese expatriate footballers
Portuguese expatriate sportspeople in Romania
Expatriate footballers in Romania
Portuguese expatriate sportspeople in Malta
Expatriate footballers in Malta
Portuguese expatriate sportspeople in Germany
Expatriate footballers in Germany